"Your Kisses Will" is a song written by Van Stephenson, and recorded by American country music artist Crystal Gayle. It was released in July 1979 as the first single from the album We Should Be Together.  The song reached #7 on the Billboard Hot Country Singles & Tracks chart.

Background
"Your Kisses Will" was originally record on November 1, 1976 at Jack's Tracks, a studio located in Nashville, Tennessee. Other tracks recorded at the session were "River Road", "Through Believing in Love Songs", and a cover of "Green Door". The session was produced by Allen Reynolds.

"Your Kisses Will" was officially released as a single in July 1979 and peaked at number seven on the Billboard Hot Country Singles chart later that year. Additionally, the song reached the top-forty of the Billboard Hot Adult Contemporary Tracks chart, reaching thirty-fifth position there. "Your Kisses Will" also peaked in the fourteenth position on the Canadian RPM Country Songs chart and the fifth position of the RPM Adult Contemporary Tracks list.

Track listing 
7" vinyl single
 "Your Kisses Will" – 2:05
 "Time Will Prove That I'm Right" – 2:38

Weekly charts

References 

1979 songs
1979 singles
Crystal Gayle songs
Song recordings produced by Allen Reynolds
Songs written by Van Stephenson
United Artists Records singles